Karuwa is traditional vessel used in Nepali households to serve water and liquor. Generally, a karuwa is made of brass for daily use. However, decorative karuwas are made from precious metals such as silver and gold.

Construction 
Karuwas have a curved body and a neck to pour liquid, like a kettle. The mouth of the karuwa is covered with a cap that has various artefacts welded to it. To allow smooth pouring when locked, a small hole is also made in the cap to balance air pressure.

Traditional uses 

Karuwa is required in various Nepalese rituals, events and festivals. It is used in various functions such as weddings, bratabandha, Pasni (celebration), etc.

In Newari culture, karuwa is worshipped on the day of Mha Puja, alongside other household utensils and appliances.

Major manufacturing places 
Most karuwas in Nepal are manufactured in the Palpa, Sankhuwasabha and Bhojpur districts. However, the industry has shrunk due to lack of demand.

One of the biggest karuwas is found in Palpa district of Nepal and it is considered the biggest of its kind in world. The karuwa is installed outside the Tansen municipality office. The same district also have built the world's largest portable karuwa, which is cast in bronze and weighs 150 kg.

Gallery

See also
Dhaka topi, traditional cap of Nepal

References

Nepalese culture
Kitchenware